Mineral del Chico  is a town and one of the 84 municipalities of Hidalgo, in central-eastern Mexico.  The municipality covers an area of 118.2 km².

As of 2010, the municipality had a total population of 7,980.

Climate

See also
Mineral del Monte

References

Municipalities of Hidalgo (state)
Populated places in Hidalgo (state)
Pueblos Mágicos